Jenny Reynolds is an American folk singer-songwriter. She began her career performing at open mics in the Boston area in the early 1990s, while working as a high-school English teacher. After several years of performing, she quit teaching to pursue music full-time, though she continues to do creative writing workshops with schoolchildren. She moved to Austin, Texas in 2003, and was a Kerrville New Folk Finalist the same year.

Her song "Whisper" appeared on a Signature Sounds compilation CD titled Respond.  The release, which also featured tracks by Lori McKenna, Catie Curtis, Jennifer Kimball, and others, raised money for domestic violence causes.

Discography
 Colored in Poetry (1998)
 Bare (EP) (2000)
 Bet on the Wind (2003)
 Next to You (2008)
 Any Kind of Angel (2020)

References

External links
 Official web site

American women singers
Songwriters from Massachusetts
Musicians from Boston
American folk musicians
Living people
Year of birth missing (living people)
21st-century American women